Catalonian Nights Vol. 3 is a live album by pianist Tete Montoliu recorded in Spain in 1980 and released on the Danish label SteepleChase in 1989.

Track listing
 "Easy Living" (Ralph Rainger, Leo Robin ) – 11:50
 "No Greater Love" (Isham Jones, Marty Symes) – 10:04
 "Jo Vull Que M'Acariciis" (Tete Montoliu) – 10:13
 "Scrapple from the Apple" (Charlie Parker) – 6:19
 "When Lights Are Low" (Benny Carter, Spencer Williams) – 8:04
 "We'll Be Together Again" (Carl T. Fischer, Frankie Laine) – 10:20
 "Joy Spring" (Clifford Brown) – 5:40
 "Bags' Groove" (Milt Jackson) – 9:27

Personnel
Tete Montoliu – piano
John Heard – bass
Albert Heath – drums

References

Tete Montoliu live albums
1989 live albums
SteepleChase Records live albums